Charles Jacob may refer to:
Charles Donald Jacob (1838–1898), American politician who served as mayor of Louisville, Kentucky and United States Minister to Colombia
Charles Jacob (stockbroker) (1921–2015), British stockbroker
Charles Jacob (geologist) (1878–1962), French geologist and president of the French National Centre for Scientific Research from 1940 to 1944

See also
Charles Jacobs (disambiguation)